was a Japanese lady-in-waiting in the court of the Imperial House of Japan. She was a favourite concubine of Emperor Kōmei and the mother of Emperor Meiji.

Biography

Parents 
Nakayama Yoshiko was the daughter of Lord Nakayama Tadayasu, Minister of the Left (Sadaijin) and a member of the Fujiwara clan. Her mother was Matsura Aiko (1818–1906), the 11th daughter of the daimyō of the Hirado domain, Matsura Seizan.

At the court 
She was born in Kyoto and entered service of the court at the age of 16. She became a concubine of Kōmei, who was also her third cousin once removed, and on 3 November 1852, gave birth to her only offspring Mutsuhito, later known as Emperor Meiji, at her father’s residence outside of the Kyoto Imperial Palace. She returned with her son to the Palace five years later. Her son was the eldest of six born to Emperor Kōmei.

After the Meiji Restoration, she relocated to the new capital to Tokyo City in 1870 at the behest of her son the Emperor. She is buried in Toshimagaoka cemetery in Bunkyō, Tokyo.

Honours
Grand Cordon of the Order of the Precious Crown (17 January 1900)

Order of precedence
Third rank (Fourth day, eighth month of Keio (1868))
Second rank (Seventh day, ninth month of Keio (1868))
Senior second rank (1889)
First rank (15 January 1900)

Ancestry

Sources

Bibliography
  /;  OCLC 46731178

1836 births
1907 deaths
Japanese concubines
Fujiwara clan
Imperial House of Japan
Nakayama family
People from Kyoto
Emperor Meiji

Grand Cordons (Imperial Family) of the Order of the Precious Crown